The 2014 LEB Oro playoffs was the final stage of the 2013–14 LEB Oro season. They started on 11 April 2013, and finished on May 18.

The quarterfinals were played in a best-of-3 games format, while the semifinals and the finals in a best-of-5 games format. The best seeded team plays at home the games 1, 2 and 5 if necessary. Ford Burgos was the winner and promoted to 2014–15 ACB season with River Andorra MoraBanc, the champion of the regular season.

Bracket

Quarterfinals

Quesos Cerrato Palencia – Instituto Fertilidad Clínicas Rincón

Ford Burgos – Cocinas.com

Ribeira Sacra Breogán Lugo – Peñas Huesca

Leyma Natura Básquet Coruña – Unión Financiera Baloncesto Oviedo

Semifinals

Quesos Cerrato Palencia – Unión Financiera Baloncesto Oviedo

Ford Burgos – Ribeira Sacra Breogán Lugo

Final

Quesos Cerrato Palencia – Ford Burgos

References

LEB Oro playoffs
playoff